The 2014 World Aesthetic Gymnastics Championships, the 15th edition of the Aesthetic group gymnastics competition, was held in Moscow, Russia from May 23 to 25.

Medal winners

World Aesthetic Gymnastics
World Aesthetic
International gymnastics competitions hosted by Russia
World Aesthetic Gymnastics Championships
Sports competitions in Moscow
May 2014 sports events in Russia